Jonas Nainys (born June 25, 1983, Pasvalys, Lithuania), better known by his stage name DJ Jovani, is a Lithuanian music producer, radio and TV host.

Background

Early life and career 
Jonas Nainys was born on 25 June 1983 in Pasvalys. He attended Petras Vileišis school in Pasvalys. He enrolled in Vilnius University Šiauliai Academy and earned a bachelor's degree in Philosophy. In 1998, Nainys made his debut appearance as a DJ at a school event. In 2003, he began performing at several nightclubs. After that, Nainys started his broadcasting career on the popular local radio station, Saulės Radijas.

In 2006, he first gained fame through his appearance in LNK reality show Lith. Ideali pora and won it. Jonas Nainys hosted the Jovani At Club program that focussed on nightlife and nightclub culture. During this program, Jonas interviewed many famous musicians such as Fedde Le Grand, Funkerman, Tiësto, David Guetta, James Zabiela and many others. Soon after, Jonas Nainys landed a job as a host at the radio station ZIP FM. In 2007, he co-founded the Radistai DJs, a musical group and event management firm, with Rolandas Mackeviius.

In 2013, Nainys released the music album On Air, which they recorded in collaboration with Vaidas Baumila, Justinas Jarutis, Linas Adomaitis, and others. It contained a total of 13 dance tracks, and 15,000 copies were sold in Lithuania. Radistai released their second album On Road, after a three-year hiatus, which likewise sold 15,000 copies. One song of this album Good Things was noticed by American record label Warner Music and released under their name. They also started organizing arena events in 2013.
In 2017, he nominated for Electronic Act of the Year award at the Music Association Awards of the Year.
Radistai celebrated Christmas 2019 at the Žalgiris Arena. Performers such as Vaidas Baumila, Justinas Jarutis, Mantas Wizard, Donatas Montvydas, Monika Linkytė, Flying Saucer Gang, Mad Money, and many others performed at these events.
In 2019, Radistai launched the Inconvenient Questions show (Lith. Nepatogūs klausimai). The show is broadcast by the news portal Delfi.lt and many famous Lithuanian personalities have appeared on the show.

Notable shows 
 M.A.M.A. awards event, 2012.
 M.A.M.A. awards event, 2014.
 Season four of Lietuvos balsas, 2015.
 First season of the LNK show Women vs Men (Lith. Moterys prieš vyrus), 2015.
 LNK show Good One! (Lith. Čia tai geras!), 2017.
 Second season of the show Women vs Men (Lith. Moterys prieš vyrus), 2017.

References 
 Only a small portion of the content in this page is based on the Lithuanian version.

Living people
1983 births
Lithuanian television presenters
Vilnius University Šiauliai Academy alumni
People from Pasvalys